Giuseppe Prezzolini (27 January 1882 – 16 July 1982) was an Italian literary critic, journalist, editor and writer. He later became an American citizen.

Biography
Prezzolini was born in Perugia in January 1882, to Tuscan parents from Siena, Luigi and Emilia Pianigiani. In 1903 he founded together with Giovanni Papini the literary journal Leonardo. In 1908 he founded La Voce, a cultural and literary journal that grew to become very influential.

In 1929 he moved to the United States, where he taught at Columbia University in New York and served as Head of that University's Casa Italiana. He was the author of many books in both Italian and English, including primary essays of philosophy, history and literary criticism.

He died in Lugano on 16 July 1982.

Works 
 La coltura italiana (with Giovanni Papini). Florence, Soc. An. Editrice "La Voce", 1906
 L'arte di persuadere, 1907
Cos'è il modernismo?, 1908
La teoria sindacalista, 1909
Benedetto Croce, Naples, Ricciardi, 1909
Vecchio e nuovo nazionalismo, (with G. Papini), 1914
Dopo Caporetto. Rome, La Voce, 1919.
Vittorio Veneto. Rome, La Voce, 1920.
 Codice della vita italiana, 1921.
Benito Mussolini. Rome, Formiggini, 1924.
Mi pare.... Fiume, Edizioni Delta, 1925.
Giovanni Amendola. Rome, Formiggini, 1925.
Vita di Nicolò Machiavelli fiorentino, 1927.

Published in the United States
Come gli Americani scoprirono l'Italia. 1750-1850, 1933;
L'italiano inutile, 1954;
Saper leggere, 1956;
Tutta l'America, 1958;
The Legacy of Italy, 1948 (published in Italy as L'Italia finisce, ecco quel che resta, Vallecchi, 1958)

After Prezzolini's return to Italy
 Ideario, 1967;
 Dio è un rischio, 1969;

After Prezzolini's move to Lugano, Switzerland
Manifesto dei conservatori. Milan, Rusconi, 1972;
Amendola e «La Voce». Florence Sansoni, 1973;
La Voce, 1908-1913. Cronaca, antologia e fortuna di una rivista. Milan, Rusconi, 1974;
Storia tascabile della letteratura italiana. Milan, Pan, 1976;
Sul fascismo. 1915-1975. Milan, Pan, 1977;
Prezzolini alla finestra. Milan, Pan, 1977.

Memoirs and correspondence
Storia di un'amicizia (correspondence with Giovanni Papini), 2 voll., 1966–68
 Giovanni Boine, Carteggio, vol. I, Giovanni Boine – Giuseppe Prezzolini (1908-1915) pp. xviii-262, 1971
Giuseppe De Luca, Giuseppe Prezzolini, Carteggio (1925-1962), 1975
Carteggio Giuseppe Prezzolini, Ardengo Soffici. 1: 1907-1918. A cura di Mario Richter. Rome, Edizioni di Storia e Letteratura, 1977. (Scheda libro)
 Carteggio Giuseppe Prezzolini, Ardengo Soffici. 2: 1920-1964. Edited by Mario Richter and Maria Emanuela Raffi. Rome, Edizioni di Storia e Letteratura, 1982
 Carteggio 1904-1945, con Benedetto Croce, 1990
Giuseppe Prezzolini - Mario Missiroli, Carteggio (1906-1974), edited by and with an introduction by Alfonso Botti, Rome-Lugano, Edizioni di Storia e Letteratura, Dipartimento dell'Istruzione e cultura del Cantone Ticino, 1992, pp. XL-472
Antonio Baldini, Giuseppe Prezzolini, Carteggio 1912-1962, pp. xxii-150, 1993
Piero Marrucchi, Giuseppe Prezzolini, Carteggio 1902-1918, pp. xxvi-250, 1997
 Giovanni Angelo Abbo, Giuseppe Prezzolini, Carteggio 1956-1982, pp. xii-236, 2000
Diario, 1900-1941. Milan, Rusconi, 1978
Diario, 1942-1968. Milan, Rusconi, 1980

Posthumous publications
Vita di Niccolò Machiavelli fiorentino. Milan, Rusconi, 1994. .
Intervista sulla Destra. Milan, Mondadori, 1994. .
Diario, 1968-1982. Milan, Rusconi, 1999.
Codice della vita italiana, Robin, 2003. .
 Addio a Papini (with Ardengo Soffici), edited by M. Attucci and L. Corsetti, Poggio a Caiano - Prato, Associazione Culturale Ardengo Soffici - Pentalinea, 2006. .

References

1882 births
1982 deaths
People from Perugia
Italian male non-fiction writers
Italian fascists
Italian newspaper founders
Italian magazine founders
Italian magazine editors
Columbia University faculty
Italian emigrants to the United States
Italian centenarians
Men centenarians